Conan the Barbarian is a collection of six fantasy short stories written by Robert E. Howard featuring his seminal sword and sorcery hero of the same name, first published in paperback by Del Rey/Ballantine Books in July 2011 as a tie-in with the movie of the same title. The stories originally appeared in the 1930s in the fantasy magazine Weird Tales. An earlier collection with the same title but different contents was issued in hardcover by Gnome Press in 1955.

Contents:
"The Phoenix on the Sword"
"The People of the Black Circle"
"The Tower of the Elephant"
"Queen of the Black Coast"
"Red Nails"
"Rogues in the House"

Notes

2011 short story collections
Conan the Barbarian books
Del Rey books